KS Võitleja Narva (Temperance Society "Fighter" Narva) was an Estonian football club based in Narva. It was founded on 13 March 1911 as part of a local sports club of the same name.

Võitleja was one of the four teams that in 1921 participated in the first official Estonian football championship organised by the Estonian Football Association. It was played as a knock-out tournament, where in the semi-finals Võitleja lost to Tallinna Jalgpalli Klubi.

It was dissolved in 1941 because of World War II.

Championship history

References

Defunct football clubs in Estonia
Association football clubs established in 1911
History of Narva
1911 establishments in Estonia
1911 establishments in the Russian Empire
1941 disestablishments in Estonia
Association football clubs disestablished in 1941